Mitchell Tony Oxborrow (born 18 February 1995) is an Australian professional football (soccer) player who plays as a central midfielder for Perth Glory in the A-League.

Early life
Oxborrow was born and raised in the East End of London until age ten, when he moved with his family to Perth. Oxborrow attended both Woodvale Primary School and Woodvale Secondary College where he competed in the football program. Oxborrow showed talent from a young age.

Playing career
He scored his last A-League goal in a 2–2 draw against Western Sydney Wanderers on 19 December 2015 with a long-range direct free kick.

Oxborrow returned to Newcastle in June 2017, joining Broadmeadow Magic in the National Premier Leagues Northern NSW but cited his ambition to return to the A-League.

Oxborrow signed a one-year contract with Brisbane Roar in August 2017. In May 2018, Oxborrow was released along with teammate Corey Gameiro.

Oxborrow returned to Broadmeadow Magic in 2018, where he intentionally spat on an Adamstown Rosebud player. He was suspended for 6 games.

Oxborrow returned to Perth Glory for the 2021/22 A-League Season.

References

1995 births
Living people
Footballers from Dagenham
Newcastle Jets FC players
Perth Glory FC players
Brisbane Roar FC players
Australian soccer players
English footballers
English emigrants to Australia
Association football midfielders
A-League Men players
National Premier Leagues players
Australia youth international soccer players
Australia under-20 international soccer players
Broadmeadow Magic FC players